Aluf (Rear Admiral)  Shmuel "Shmulik" Tankus (‎; 14 November 1914 – 4 March 2012) was the fifth commander of the Israeli Navy, serving from 30 June 1954 until 1960.

Tankus was born in 1914 in the Neve Shalom district of Jaffa under Ottoman-controlled Palestine. He was scion to a clan from the Caucasus that had settled in Palestine following a vision by the clan's elder.
He studied at The Herzliya Hebrew Gymnasium in Tel Aviv

He joined the Palmach, and served in Palyam. He reported to Yohai Ben-Nun, who was Commander of the Port Brigade and is considered the father of the Israeli Naval Academy.

In 1942, he married Yafa Grobshtein. They had a daughter, Ruth, who volunteered for service in the Navy. He lived in Haifa from 1952 onwards. In 2001, he was accorded the honour of Friend or Beloved of the municipality.

References

External links
Official Website of the Palyam
Grapevine: Honoring the past by celebrating in the present The Jerusalem Post,

Palmach members
Israeli Navy generals
Aliyah Bet activists
2012 deaths
1914 births
People from Jaffa